This article is about the particular significance of the year 1933 to Wales and its people.

Incumbents

Archbishop of Wales – Alfred George Edwards, Bishop of St Asaph
Archdruid of the National Eisteddfod of Wales – Gwili

Events
1 March (Saint David's Day) – A flag displaying the red Welsh Dragon flies officially alongside the Union Jack over Caernarfon Castle. 
28 March - Rhondda East by-election: William Mainwaring retains the seat for Labour against Communist and Liberal opposition.
June/July – Seven men and four women receive custodial sentences after a riot at Bedwas over strikebreaking.
22 July – Amy Johnson and Jim Mollison take off from Pendine on the first non-stop aeroplane flight from Great Britain to the United States.
Ronald Lockley establishes the first British bird observatory on Skokholm.

Arts and literature
April–May – Dylan Thomas's poem And death shall have no dominion is written and published.
June - The first Gregynog Music Festival, Wales' oldest extant classical music festival, is organised by the sisters Margaret and Gwendoline Davies (granddaughters of Victorian industrialist David Davies) at their home, Gregynog Hall in Tregynon, Montgomeryshire.
Percy Cudlipp becomes editor of the Evening Standard – the youngest ever editor of a British national newspaper.

Awards
National Eisteddfod of Wales (held in Wrexham)
National Eisteddfod of Wales: Chair – Edgar Phillips
National Eisteddfod of Wales: Crown – Simon B. Jones

New books

English language
D. J. Davies – The Economic History of South Wales
A. H. Dodd – The Industrial Revolution in North Wales
Caradoc Evans – Wasps
Margiad Evans – The Wooden Doctor
Lily Tobias - Eunice Fleet

Welsh language
John Bodvan Anwyl - Fy hanes i fy hunan
Gwilym Owen – Rhyfeddodau'r Cread
Isaac Morris – Proffwydi'r Wythfed Ganrif Cyn Crist

Music
Ieuan Rees-Davies – Transposition at the keyboard (manual)

Film
Ivor Novello stars in I Lived with You, Sleeping Car, and Autumn Crocus.

Broadcasting
28 May – The BBC begins broadcasting the Welsh Regional Programme to South Wales from the Washford transmitter
17 July – The BBC begins broadcasting the National Programme to South Wales from the Washford transmitter
The first broadcast is made from the Urdd Eisteddfod.

Sport
Rugby union, although collecting the 'wooden spoon' in the Home Nations Championship, Wales beat England at Twickenham for the very first time, after ten previous attempts.

Births
2 January – Keith Thomas, early modern historian and academic
7 February – Stuart Burrows, opera singer
21 March – Michael Heseltine, politician
3 April – Alan Watkins, political journalist (d. 2010)
22 April – Anthony Llewellyn, Welsh-American scientist (d. 2013)
14 May – Siân Phillips, actress
20 June
Dai Dower, British, European and Empire flyweight boxing champion
Dorothy Simpson, detective fiction writer
30 June – John Faull, Wales international and British Lion rugby player
17 August – Jack Hurrell, Wales international rugby union player (d. 2003) 
1 September – Bedwyr Lewis Jones, writer and scholar (d. 1992)
12 September – Len Allchurch, footballer (d. 2016)
24 September – Terry Davies, Wales rugby captain and British Lion (d. 2021)
25 September – David Parry-Jones, rugby commentator (d. 2017)
12 November – Jeffrey Thomas, politician (d. 1989)
17 November – Alan Harrington, footballer (d. 2019)
28 November – Noel Trigg, light heavyweight boxer
31 December – Glyn Davidge, Wales international and British Lion rugby player

Deaths
8 January – Sir John Ballinger, librarian, 72
14 January – Sir Robert Jones, orthopaedic surgeon (baronet), 75
18 January – John Thomas, chemist (ICI), 46
2 February – Sir James Cory, 1st Baronet, politician, 76 
15 February – Jere Blake, Wales international rugby player, 47/48
23 February – David Watts Morgan, Member of Parliament for Rhondda East, 65
4 April – Sir Marteine Lloyd, 2nd Baronet, 82
29 May – Llewelyn Kenrick, footballer, 84
16 July – John Tudor Walters, politician, 64/65
10 August – Alf Morgans, Prime Minister of Western Australia, 83
13 September – David Morgan, Wales international rugby player, 61
20 September – Alfred Cattell, Wales international rugby player, 76
17 October – Sid Bevan, Wales international rugby union player, 56
18 October – Ivor Herbert, 1st Baron Treowen, soldier and politician, 82
10 November – Herbert Lewis, politician, 74

See also
1933 in Northern Ireland

References